Veeramae Vaagai Soodum is a 2022 Indian Tamil-language action thriller film written and directed by Thu Pa Saravanan and produced by Vishal and Dato Abdul Malik under the banner of Vishal Film Factory and Malik Streams Corporation. Later the film was released and dubbed in Telugu as Saamanyudu. It stars Vishal, Dimple Hayathi, Baburaj in the lead roles. The title is a reference of a lyric of the title track of 1986 film Vikram, composed by Ilaiyaraaja (father of Yuvan Shankar Raja). This was the last film of noted actor-director R. N. R. Manohar, who died on 17 November 2021 from COVID-19 complications and was posthumously released in February 2022, 3 months after his death.

The film was released in theatres on 4 February 2022. where it received mixed reviews from critics with praise for the action sequences, performances(particularly Vishal) and score but criticized the writing, script, predictability, outdated plot and poorly written characters.  The film was a box-office bomb.

Plot 
Purushottam alias Porus is an aspiring police trainee, whose aim is to become a IPS officer. He hails from a middle-class family consisting of his father, sister Dwaraka and her mother. However, their happiness is short lived when Dwaraka is kidnapped by influential industrialist Nedunchezhiyan's brother Elanchezhiyan alias Ela, but manages to escape where she is killed by Nedunchezhiyan and Ela, as she witnessed the murder of a social activist named Parishuddam, when he started a protest against his factory, which destroyed a prosperous village. Dwaraka's murder is placed on her eve-teaser Guna, the brother of a local don named Selvam. 

However, Porus learns that Guna has been murdered in prison and decides to investigate in his own way where he uncovers some brutal murders, which is orchestrated by Nedunchezhiyan and his gang. Porus finds out that a girl named Divya was to be abducted by Ela, but Dwaraka was accidentally kidnapped by him. Nedunchezhiyan's men learn about this and attack Divya, but Porus arrives in time and thrashes the goons, but can't save Divya. However, Porus's friend Faizal, who was killed by Nedunchezhiyan's gang, had received a recording of Dwaraka's confession about the murder and stores it in his phone. Porus tells a hacker to check Faizal's phone and the hacker gives the recording to Porus and learns about Parishuddam's murder. 

Nedunchezhiyan learns about the recording from the henchmen, and kidnaps Porus's father, where he tells Porus to hand over the recording or else he would see his father die. Porus brings the recording where he is thrashed by the gang, but Porus retaliates by thrashing the gang and also kills Ela. Porus brings Selvam where he tells him to avenge Guna's death. Selvam kills Nedunchezhiyan with a chainsaw, while Porus leaves the factory with his father. With Divya's father's help, Porus stuffs a dead Nedunchezhiyan and Ela into a meat grinder and feeds their flesh to a crocodiles in a zoo (where Divya's father works) as there would be no evidence about their deaths. After this, Porus is finally appointed as an IPS officer.

Cast 

 Vishal as Purushottam a.k.a. Porus
 Dimple Hayathi as Mythili
 Raveena Ravi as Dwaraka
 Baburaj as Nedunchezhiyan
 Yogi Babu as Thalapathy
 G. Marimuthu as Porus and Dwaraka's father
 K. S. G. Venkatesh as Mythili's father
 V. I. S. Jayapalan as Nedunchezhiyan's father
 Billy Muralee as Nedunchezhiyan's henchman
 Akilan S. Pushparaj as Faizal
 Navin Krubhakar A U as Nallan
 R. N. R. Manohar as Kaatamuthu
 Elango Kumaravel as Parishuddam
 Kavitha Bharathy
 Vazhakku En Muthuraman
 Tulasi as Porus and Dwaraka's mother
 Raja Chembolu as Elanchezhiyan a.k.a. Ela, Nedunchezhiyan's younger brother
 George Maryan as Divya’s father

Production

Development 
The film was tentatively titled as Vishal 31. On 29 August 2021, the film's title was announced as Veerame Vaagai Soodum.

Casting 
Vishal was cast as an aspiring police officer named Porus. Dimple Hayathi was cast in as the female lead opposite Vishal which was her second Tamil film after Devi 2, while Malayalam actor Baburaj  was cast in as the main antagonist.

Filming 
Principal photography began on 6 May 2021 and was wrapped up on 3 January 2022.

Music 
Yuvan Shankar Raja composed the soundtrack and background score of the film while collaborating with actor Vishal for the eleventh time after Sandakozhi, Thimiru, Thaamirabharani, Theeradha Vilaiyattu Pillai, Avan Ivan, Samar, Poojai, Irumbu Thirai, Sandakozhi 2 and Chakra. The first single "Rise Of A Common Man" was released on 22 December 2021. The second single was released on January 14, 2022.

Release

Theatrical
The dubbed versions are Hindi, Telugu and Kannada languages Kannada is titled as (obba)

The film was released on 4 February 2022.

Home Media 
The satellite and digital rights of the film were sold to ZEE5 and Zee Tamil.

Reception

Box office 
	The film had a lackluster opening weekend, grossing only .

Critical response 
The film received mixed reviews from critics. India Herald gave the film 3 stars for its performances and action writing "Overall, A Regular Action Drama with Vishal's Action is the saving grace." Pinkvilla gave the film 3 out of 5 praising the story and performances but criticized the outdated plot, writing "Director Thu Pa Saravanan needs an appreciation here. He definitely came up with a good story and with the good cast that elevated the story, he has done a great job." Movicrow gave the film 2.25 out of 5 writing "What might have been a simple and relatable actioner, turns into a lengthy boring fair as the movie takes itself so seriously by trying to touch and bring together too many needless topics." Ashameera Aiyappan of Firstpost gave the film 2 out of 5 criticizing the plot writing "The film argues that bravery is enough to win. But it is not enough to be bold; one also needs to be smart. Unfortunately, the film fails on that front." Sowmya Rajendran of The News Minute gave the film 1.5 out of 5 criticizing the execution and writing but praised the action sequences and score, writing "Thu Pa Saravanan’s film is so full of cliches and convenient coincidences that I wondered if the title ‘Kaadhil Poo Soodavum’ would have been more suitable since that's what it demands from the audience."

References

External links 
 

Indian action thriller films
2020s Tamil-language films
2022 action thriller films
Films scored by Yuvan Shankar Raja
Films about sexual harassment
Films about sexual abuse
2022 directorial debut films